The Hanseatic Goethe Prize (German: Hansischer Goethe-Preis) was a German literary and artistic award, given biennially from  1949 to 2005 to a figure of European stature. The prize money was €25,000. On the occasion of Goethe's 200th birthday, the Freiherr vom Stein Foundation in Hamburg endowed a cultural prize "for important personalities in the intellectual life". The prize was awarded by the foundation of the Hamburg businessman Alfred Toepfer, Alfred Toepfer Foundation F. V. S..

Recipients

1951 Martin Buber
1955 T. S. Eliot
1956 Walter Gropius
1958 Paul Tillich
1961 Benjamin Britten
1967 Salvador de Madariaga
1969  (French Germanist)
 1971 Giorgio Strehler
1973 Manès Sperber
1974 Hanns Lilje
1975 Carlo Schmid
1989 Carl Friedrich von Weizsäcker
1995 Nikolaus Harnoncourt
1997 Harald Weinrich
1999 Ryszard Kapuściński
2001 Pina Bausch
2003 Cees Nooteboom
2005 Ariane Mnouchkine (refused, because of Toepfer's activities in and for the Third Reich)

See also
 German literature
 List of literary awards
 List of poetry awards
 List of years in literature
 List of years in poetry
 Goethe Prize

References

Further reading
 

German literary awards
Johann Wolfgang von Goethe